Typhoon Maria was a minimal typhoon which brushed the southeastern coast of Japan during early August 2006. The seventh named storm of the 2006 Pacific typhoon season, Maria formed out of a tropical depression over the open waters of the western Pacific Ocean. On August 5, the Japan Meteorological Agency (JMA) classified the depression as a tropical storm while the Joint Typhoon Warning Center (JTWC) kept it as a depression. The storm quickly strengthened into a typhoon the next day, reaching its peak intensity with winds of 130 km/h (80 mph 10-minute winds) early on August 6. The storm gradually weakened as it began to recurve, causing it to parallel the southeastern coast of Japan. On August 9, Maria weakened into a tropical depression and later into an extratropical cyclone before dissipating on August 15. Maria had only minor effects in Japan, mainly heavy rains which were estimated to have peaked over 400 mm (15.7 in) on the Izu Peninsula. One person was killed after being struck by lightning and six others were injured.

Meteorological history

On August 3, the Japan Meteorological Agency (JMA) began monitoring a tropical depression located to the southeast of Minami Torishima Island. The depression slowly developed as it moved towards the west-northwest. At 1630 UTC on August 5, the Joint Typhoon Warning Center (JTWC) issued a Tropical Cyclone Formation Alert on the developing system while it was located about 740 km (460 mi) east-northeast of the northern Mariana Islands. Deep convection was present around the center of circulation but the overall structure of the storm resembled a subtropical cyclone. However, the storm was likely to intensify as it was located within an area of low to moderate vertical wind shear with favorable diffulence aloft. Later that day, the JMA upgraded the depression to a tropical storm and gave it the name Maria; a name submitted by the United States and a common Chamorro feminine name. Maria continued towards the west-northwest along the edge of a broad subtropical ridge located east of Japan.

As the JMA issued their first advisory, the JTWC designated the system as Tropical Depression 09W while located about 280 km (175 mi) east-northeast of Iwo Jima. Early the next day, the JMA classified Maria as a severe tropical storm with winds of 95 km/h (60 mph 10-minute winds) while the JTWC reported that Maria had just become a tropical storm with winds reaching 75 km/h (45 mph 1-minute winds). The storm also had a slight northward relocation. Tracking towards the northwest, the storm intensified into a typhoon and reached its peak intensity with winds of 130 km/h (80 mph 10-minute winds) and minimum pressure of 975 hPa (mbar) at 0900 UTC. Around the same time, the JTWC assessed the storm to have reached its peak intensity with winds of 110 km/h (70 mph 1-minute winds). However, the JTWC operationally classified Maria as a minimal typhoon with winds of 120 km/h (75 mph 1-minute winds) on August 7.

On August 7, a banding eye feature developed with deep convection around the eastern portion of the storm. Later that day, the storm sharply recurved towards the northeast and paralleled the southern coastline of Honshu. As Maria made the turn, dry air began to enter the system, causing it to weaken. Along with the dry air, wind shear began to increase and the JMA downgraded Maria to a severe tropical storm early on August 8. The storm continued to weaken as it came very close to landfall near Tokyo, Japan on August 9. Both agencies downgraded Maria to a tropical depression early on August 9, with the JTWC issuing their final advisory at that time. Maria remained a tropical depression for another 24 hours before transitioning into an extratropical cyclone on August 10 while located about 835 km (520 mi) east-northeast of Tokyo. The extratropical remnants turned towards the north and dissipated late on August 14 over the Sea of Okhotsk.

Preparations and impact
Weather officials warned residents about heavy rains, strong winds, and high waves in the Tōkai region, Kantō region, Kōshin'etsu region, and the Izu Islands between August 8 and 9. Seven flights out of Tokyo at Haneda airport were cancelled due to Maria. The JR Ito Line, an express train line, was temporarily shut down as a result of rain. As Maria brushed Japan, it produced heavy rains over the southeastern areas of the country. Yokota Air Base recorded 38.1 mm (1.5 in) of rainfall and winds up to 34 km/h (21 mph). In Gifu Prefecture, thunderstorms associated with the typhoon resulted in a landslide that knocked out power to 510 residences. One man was injured and two cows died after a small farm was severely damaged by high winds. Flooding and landslides affected dozens of homes in Chōshi, Chiba, prompting the evacuation of 63 families. One person was killed in Tokyo after being struck by lightning. Five people were injured when a plane headed for Tokyo encountered turbulence produced by Maria.

See also

2006 Pacific typhoon season
Timeline of the 2006 Pacific typhoon season

References

External links

JMA General Information of Typhoon Maria (0607) from Digital Typhoon
JMA Best Track Data of Typhoon Maria (0607) 
JMA Best Track Data (Graphics) of Typhoon Maria (0607)
JMA Best Track Data (Text)
JTWC Best Track Data  of Tropical Storm 09W (Maria)
09W.MARIA from the U.S. Naval Research Laboratory

2006 Pacific typhoon season
Typhoons in Japan
Typhoon Maria
Typhoons
Maria